The Latsos is an internationally known American classical piano duo formed by Giorgi Latso and Anna Latso. Although they initially pursued solo careers, they teamed up as duo-pianists in 2013 and conducted annual international tours, four-hands piano recitals and concertos for two pianos and orchestra in Europe, Russia, Americas and Asia.
Duo formed in the city of Vienna in 2013 is best known for their interpretations of Franz Schubert piano pieces for Four- hands, and also known for their light arrangements of familiar classical pieces, movie soundtracks, and show tunes according to a press release from The Guardian, British daily newspaper.   

The Latsos Duo has resided in Austria, from 2013-2019, where Giorgi had joined the piano faculty of the Vienna Prayner Conservatory of Music and Dramatic Arts as professor of piano  and at the same time he was a guest professor at the Liceu Conservatory in Barcelona. 
  Subsequently, since 2020 they have made their homes in Los Angeles.

Repertoire 
The Latsos's repertoire ranges from Bach to 21st-century classical music, including all major works for piano four hands and orchestral transcriptions, with a focus on French, Russian and German composers. 
The duo performs at concert halls across Europe, America and Asia including Music Center Los Angeles, Los Angeles County Museum of Art, Beverly Hills Greystone, Torrance Performing Arts Center, San Diego Neil Morgan Auditorium,  Yamaha Center in Bangkok, Music Center in Singapore, Imperial Marmorsaal Concert Hall Vienna, Ehrbarsaal in Vienna, Linzer Stadthalle, Belgais Center for Arts in Portugal, Turgenev Art Gallery in Moscow, etc.
.
The Latsos have rediscovered, performed and recorded a number of unusual and forgotten works from the duo-piano repertoire, including all the Schubert duets and duos. The pianists have developed a close relationship with composer Joe Giarrusso, who created and dedicated some four-hand pieces especially for them. Since 2013 they have been performing worldwide as piano duo and have appeared at musical centers and festivals, including Chopin Music Festival, Aspen Music Festival, Steinway Festival, Yamaha Festival, Schubertiade Music Festival, the Osterfestival Tirol and the Ruhr Piano Festival, Asia Pacific International Arts Festival, China-Beijing International Awards Ceremony 

They have also arranged for 2 pianos and four-hands transcriptions from a selected american movie scores by the celebrated composers such as John Williams, Erich Wolfgang Korngold, John Sousa, etc. and has been hailed "one of the finest transcribers of our time" in the european press.  

Extensive CD recording makes up an important part of their career: the Duo has released recordings of four-hand piano music not only with central works of the repertoire but also introducing less familiar names to a wide public.

The Latsos have performed and recorded a number of unusual and largely unknown treasures from the duo-piano repertoire, including all the Schubert duets and duos. “...The Latsos shine in enchantingly intimate dialogue and impress with their expression of emotional unrest” as Kreiszeitung describes them.
The Latsos are often guests on radios such as KUSC Radio, Classic FM, Sunday Live, NDR Kultur, Classical Sundays and many more. They have released three albums of piano music.

“...The Latsos’ execution of these transitions [in Schubert’s Fantasia] was exemplary, so that their performance gained strength and impetus as it proceeded, culminating in a powerful account of maybe the darkest final cadence Schubert ever wrote, a procession of grinding minor chords that descend like a glacier sliding into a freezing ocean.” LA Opus wrote.

One of their recent concert presentation held at the historic Doheny Estate & Gardens as part of the Music in the Mansion Series was filmed by Beverly Hills Warner Cable Television and live-streamed on BHTV10 Channel.

The duo also supports the mission of charities by organizing and performing benefit concerts each year. They often offer concerts performances for non-profit organizations and institutions that serve underprivileged communities, children with special needs, hospital patients, and the elderly. In May 2019 in collaboration with National Solidarity Fund and The Embassy of Georgia to the Republic of Austria, The Latsos Duo performed gala charity concert in support of children and young people under the age of 22 suffering from oncological disease in Georgia.

Master classes and lectures 

Giorgi and Anna Latso combine performance and teaching.  As music educators, they have presented master classes and lectures at a number of universities in Europe, Russia, Asia, as well as across the United States and regularly invited to perform at prestigious music halls and scholarly conferences worldwide as well as served as judges at various international, national and regional piano competitions. They are frequent presenters at national, state and local conferences, universities, and local music teaching groups. Latsos have given various presentations and masterclasses, including national music conferences (MTNA). 

The Latsos have been presenting collegiate masterclasses and workshops for regional and international conferences of the College Music Society, Music Teachers National Association Collegiate Chapters Symposiums, UMTA State Conference held in-person at Thanksgiving Point in Utah, Oregon Music Teachers Association State Conference at the Southern Oregon University and many more.

Awards 
 2017 - Winners of Beverly Hills National (USA) Auditions

Reviews 
An intimate knowledge of the two-piano repertoire, in combination with sound command of technique and a finely developed sense of ensemble, have allowed The Latsos to focus on the nuance and detail that has won so much praise from critics: “thrilling and flamboyant, tender and passionate, vibrant and dynamic”. Internationale Chopin-Gesellschaft Vienna, Austria. Oberösterreichische Nachrichten hailed them for being “as expressive as they are technically perfect”. The Latsos are often Oberösterreichische Nachrichtenpraised for their unity of thought and execution, a music critic of their 2019 recital in Vienna wrote: "...while hearing them one thinks, not of two pianist at two pianos, but of twenty fingers at a double keyboard controlled by a single mind".

References

External links
The Latsos official website
Palos Verdes Music Salon  
2021 UMTA Conference 
 "The Stars and Stripes Forever" arrangement on the official YT Channel

American classical pianists
Living people
Classical piano duos
21st-century classical pianists
21st-century American pianists
Georgian emigrants to the United States
American male pianists
American people of Georgian (country) descent
Musical groups established in 2013
Year of birth missing (living people)
21st-century American male musicians